Ijūin Hikokichi (伊集院 彦吉, Ijūin Hikokichi; 22 July 1864  – 26 April 1924) was a Japanese diplomat and politician who served as minister of foreign affairs and Japanese ambassador to Peking.

Early life
Ijūin was born on 22 July 1864, in Kōrai, Kagoshima, Satsuma Domain, the eldest son of samurai Ijūin Kichitsugu.

Career
Ijūin was appointed consul at Chefoo in China in 1893. He served again in China as consul general at Tientsin from 1901 to 1907. He was appointed ambassador to Peking in 1908. On 4 September 1909, he signed the Japan-China Agreement concerning Kando as the Japanese ambassador to the Ching Empire in Peking. During the Chinese Revolution broke out in October 1911, together with then Foreign Minister Uchida Yasuya, he argued for the provision of support to the Ching government. His term as ambassador to China lasted until 1913.

Then, Ijūin was appointed the Japanese ambassador to Italy in 1916 and was in office until 1920. During his tenure, he was one of the leading members of Japanese delegation at the Paris Peace Conference in 1919. Ijūin is described as a conservative ambassador.

Prime Minister Hara Takashi wanted Ijūin to search for European institutions of public information when the latter was ambassador and a Versailles delegate. Ijūin reported that the best way to create an influential information bureau was to coordinate all information sources, including army, navy and finance ministry. Eventually, a public information office, Gaimu-shō Jōhō-bu, in the ministry of foreign affairs was established on 13 August 1921, and Ijūin was appointed its head. Then he served as governor-general of Kwantung Leased Territory in northeastern China for one year. He was appointed to the post on 8 September 1922, replacing Isaburō Yamagata. Ijūin was in office until 19 September 1923.

Ijūin was appointed minister of foreign affairs on 19 September 1923 to the second cabinet of Yamamoto Gombee, replacing him who also assumed the role of foreign minister briefly from 2 to 19 September. Ijūin was replaced by Keishirō Matsui on 7 January 1924 when a new cabinet was formed by Kiyoura Keigo.

Personal life and death
Ijūin was married to Ōkubo Toshimichi's daughter, Yoshiko. Thus, he was the brother-in-law of Makino Nobuaki.

Shortly after his removal from the office, Ijūin died of neuralgia in Tokyo in April 1924.

References

External links

20th-century diplomats
20th-century Japanese politicians
1864 births
1924 deaths
Ambassadors of Japan to China
Ambassadors of Japan to Italy
Foreign ministers of Japan
Japanese colonial governors and administrators
People of the Kwantung Leased Territory